Zit or Zits may refer to:

 a pimple
 Zit (comic), an adult British comic
 Zits (comics), a syndicated daily comic strip by Jerry Scott
 Zhuzhou Institute of Technology, former name of the Hunan University of Technology